Charles Lane (born Charles Gerstle Levison; January 26, 1905 – July 9, 2007) was an American character actor and centenarian whose career spanned 72 years. Lane gave his last performance at the age of 101 as a narrator in 2006. Lane appeared in many Frank Capra films, including Mr. Deeds Goes to Town (1936), You Can't Take It with You (1938), Mr. Smith Goes to Washington (1939), Arsenic and Old Lace (1944), It's a Wonderful Life (1946) and Riding High (1950).

Lucille Ball frequently cast Lane as a no-nonsense authority figure and comedic foe of her scatterbrained TV character on her TV series I Love Lucy, The Lucy–Desi Comedy Hour and The Lucy Show. His first film role, of more than 250, was as a hotel clerk in Smart Money (1931) starring Edward G. Robinson and James Cagney.

Early life
Lane's father, an executive at the Fireman's Fund Insurance Company, was instrumental in rebuilding San Francisco after the 1906 earthquake.

Career
Lane spent a short time as an insurance salesman before taking to the stage at the Pasadena Playhouse. Actor/director Irving Pichel first suggested that Lane go into acting in 1929, and four years later Lane was a founding member of the Screen Actors Guild. He became a favorite of director Frank Capra, who used him in several films. In It's a Wonderful Life, Lane played a seemingly hard-nosed rent collector. Lane also appeared in the film Mighty Joe Young (1949) as one of the reporters cajoling Max O'Hara (Robert Armstrong) for information about the identity of "Mr. Joseph Young", the persona given featured billing on the front of the building, on opening night.

Among his many roles as a character actor, Lane played  Mr. Fosdick in Dear Phoebe, which aired on NBC in 1954–1955. He also portrayed mean-spirited railroad executive Homer Bedloe in the situation comedy Petticoat Junction. He guest starred on such series as ABC's Guestward, Ho!, starring Joanne Dru, and The Bing Crosby Show, as well as the syndicated drama of the American Civil War, The Gray Ghost.

He was a good friend of Lucille Ball, and his specialty in playing scowling, short tempered, no-nonsense professionals provided the perfect comic foil for Ball's scatterbrained television character. He played several guest roles on I Love Lucy, including an appearance in the episode "Lucy Goes To the Hospital", where he is seated in the waiting room with Ricky while Lucy gives birth to their son. He also played the title role in the episode "The Business Manager", the casting director in "Lucy Tells The Truth," and the passport clerk in "Staten Island Ferry."  Lane appeared twice in The Lucy–Desi Comedy Hour. He later had recurring roles as shopkeeper Mr. Finch on Dennis the Menace and during the first season (1962–1963) of Ball's The Lucy Show, playing banker Mr. Barnsdahl. According to The Lucy Book by Geoffrey Fidelman, Lane was let go because he had trouble reciting his lines correctly. However, Lane was in reality a placeholder for Ball's original choice, Gale Gordon, who joined the program in 1963 as Mr. Mooney after he was free from other contractual obligations.

In 1963, Lane appeared in the classic comedy It's a Mad, Mad, Mad, Mad World, playing the airport manager. (On the DVD commentary track, historian Michael Schlesinger wryly noted, "You do not have a comedy unless you have Charles Lane in it.") His final acting role was at the age of 101 in 2006's The Night Before Christmas. His last television appearance was at the age of 90, when he appeared in the 1995 Disney TV remake of its 1970 teen comedy The Computer Wore Tennis Shoes, with Kirk Cameron. In 2005, the TV Land Awards paid tribute to Lane by celebrating his 100th birthday. Seated in a wheelchair in the audience, which had sung Happy Birthday to him, Lane was presented with his award by Haley Joel Osment and then announced "If you're interested, I'm still available [for work]!" The audience gave him a standing ovation.

Lane appeared in more than 250 films and hundreds of television shows and was uncredited in many of them. On his busiest days, Lane said he sometimes played more than one role, getting into costume and filming his two or three lines, then hurrying off to another set or studio for a different costume and a different role. As for being typecast, Lane described it as "... a pain in the ass. You did something that was pretty good, and the picture was pretty good. But that pedigreed you into that type of part, which I thought was stupid and unfair, too. It didn't give me a chance, but it made the casting easier for the studio." Lane is recorded as having appeared in sixty-seven parts in a span of just two years, 1940 to 1942.

Personal life

In 1931, Lane married Ruth Covell, and they remained together for 70 years until her death in 2002. They had a son, Tom, and a daughter, Alice.

Despite his stern, hard-hearted demeanour in most of his film and television roles, friends and acquaintances have unanimously described Lane as a warm, funny and kind person. On January 26, 2007, Lane celebrated his 102nd birthday. He continued to live in the Brentwood home he bought with Ruth (for $46,000 in 1964) until his death. In the end, his son, Tom Lane, said he was talking with his father at 9 p.m. on the evening of Monday, July 9, 2007, "He was lying in bed with his eyes real wide open. Then he closed his eyes and stopped breathing." Charles Lane was 102. He died from natural causes. Lane's mother, Alice, also lived a long life; she died in 1973 at the age of 99.

Filmography

1930s

City Girl (1930) as Pedestrian walking in train station (uncredited)
Smart Money (1931) as Hotel Desk Clerk (uncredited)
The Road to Singapore (1931) as Desk Clerk at Club (uncredited)
Blonde Crazy (1931) as Four-Eyes (uncredited)
Manhattan Parade (1932) as Desk Clerk (uncredited)
Union Depot (1932) as Luggage Checkroom Clerk (uncredited)
The Mouthpiece (1932) as Hotel Desk Clerk (uncredited)
Blessed Event (1932) as Kane (uncredited)
Employees' Entrance (1933) as Shoe Salesman (uncredited)
Grand Slam (1933) as Ivan (uncredited)
Blondie Johnson (1933) as Cashier (uncredited)
42nd Street (1933) as Author of 'Pretty Lady' (uncredited)
Central Airport (1933) as Amarillo Radio Operator (uncredited)
Gold Diggers of 1933 (1933) as Society Reporter (uncredited)
Private Detective 62 (1933) as Process Server (uncredited)
She Had to Say Yes (1933) as Mr. Bernstein (uncredited)
My Woman (1933) as Conn - Bothersome Agent
The Bowery (1933) as Doctor (uncredited)
Broadway Through a Keyhole (1933) as Columnist #2 (replaced by Andrew Tombes) (uncredited)
Advice to the Lovelorn (1933) as Circulation Manager (uncredited)
Mr. Skitch (1933) as Hotel Clerk (uncredited)
The Show-Off (1934) as Mr. Weitzenkorn (uncredited)
Looking for Trouble (1934) as Switchboard Operator 
Twenty Million Sweethearts (1934) as Reporter (uncredited)
Twentieth Century (1934) as Max Jacobs aka Max Mandelbaum
Let's Talk It Over (1934) as Reporter (uncredited)
I'll Fix It (1934) as Al Nathan
Broadway Bill (1934) as Morgan's Henchman (uncredited)
A Wicked Woman (1934) as Defense Attorney Beardsley (uncredited)
The Band Plays On (1934) as Shyster Lawyer (uncredited)
One More Spring (1935) as Representative (uncredited)
Princess O'Hara (1935) as Morris Goldberg (uncredited)
Ginger (1935) as Judge (uncredited)
Woman Wanted (1935) as Defense Attorney Herman (uncredited)
Here Comes the Band (1935) as Mr. Scurry
Two for Tonight (1935) as Writer
The Milky Way (1936) as Willard
It Had Happened (1936) as State Examiner (uncredited)
Mr. Deeds Goes to Town (1936) as Hallor, crook lawyer (uncredited)
Neighborhood House (1936) (uncredited)
Ticket to Paradise (1936) as Shyster (uncredited)
The Crime of Dr. Forbes (1936) as Defense Attorney
The Bride Walks Out (1936) as Judge (uncredited)
36 Hours to Kill (1936) as Rickert
Two-Fisted Gentleman (1936) as Joe Gordon
Lady Luck (1936) as Feinberg
Easy to Take (1936) as Skip - Reporter 
Come Closer, Folks (1936) as Prosecutor (uncredited)
Three Men on a Horse (1936) as Cleaner (uncredited)
Criminal Lawyer (1937) as Nora's Attorney (uncredited)
We're on the Jury (1937) as Mr. Horace Smith
Sea Devils (1937) as Judge (uncredited)
Internes Can't Take Money (1937) as Grote
Venus Makes Trouble (1937) as District Attorney
The Jones Family in Big Business (1937) as Webster - Bank Representative (uncredited)
Born Reckless (1937) as Walden's Lawyer (uncredited)
One Mile From Heaven (1937) as Webb (uncredited)
Bad Guy (1937) as Walden's Lawyer (uncredited)
Fit for a King (1937) as Spears (uncredited)
Trapped by G-Men (1937) as Fingers
Hot Water (1937) as Grayson (uncredited)
Danger – Love at Work (1937) as Gilroy
Partners in Crime (1937) as Druggist (uncredited)
Ali Baba Goes to Town (1937) as Doctor
Nothing Sacred (1937) as Rubenstein (uncredited)
In Old Chicago (1937) as Booking Agent (scenes deleted)
City Girl (1938) as Dr. Abbott (uncredited)
Joy of Living (1938) as Fan in Margaret's Dressing Room (uncredited)
Cocoanut Grove (1938) as Weaver (uncredited)
The Rage of Paris (1938) as Department Head (uncredited)
Professor Beware (1938) as Joe - Photographer (uncredited)
You Can't Take It with You (1938) as Wilbur G. Henderson
Three Loves Has Nancy (1938) as Cleaning Store Manager (uncredited)
Always in Trouble (1938) as Donald Gower
Blondie (1938) as Furniture Salesman (uncredited)
Thanks for Everything (1938) as Dr. Olson
Kentucky (1938) as Auctioneer
Boy Slaves (1939) as Albee
Inside Story (1939) as District Attorney
Let Us Live (1939) as Auto Salesman (uncredited)
Lucky Night (1939) as Carpenter
Rose of Washington Square (1939) as Sam Kress, booking agent
Unexpected Father (1939) as Department of Health Quarantine Man (uncredited)
Second Fiddle (1939) as Studio Chief (voice, uncredited)
News Is Made at Night (1939) as District Attorney Rufe Reynolds
They All Come Out (1939) as Psychiatrist
Miracles for Sale (1939) as Fleetwood Apartments Desk Clerk (uncredited)
Fifth Avenue Girl (1939) as Union Representative (uncredited)
Golden Boy (1939) as Drake - Reporter (uncredited)
Thunder Afloat (1939) (scenes deleted)
Honeymoon in Bali (1939) as Photographer for Morrissey's (uncredited)
Mr. Smith Goes to Washington (1939) as "Nosey", reporter
Television Spy (1939) as Mr. Adler 
Beware Spooks! (1939) as Mr. Moore, Credit Man (uncredited)
The Cat and the Canary (1939) as Reporter (uncredited)
The Honeymoon's Over (1939) as D.W. O'Connor (uncredited)
Charlie McCarthy, Detective (1939) as Charlie's Doctor (uncredited)

1940s

Parole Fixer (1940) as Florist's Customer (uncredited)
Johnny Apollo (1940) as Assistant District Attorney
It's a Date (1940) as Mr. Horner (uncredited)
Primrose Path (1940) as Mr. 'Smitty' Smith / Hawkins (uncredited)
Buck Benny Rides Again (1940) as Charlie Graham
The Doctor Takes a Wife (1940) as Reporter (uncredited)
I Can't Give You Anything but Love, Baby (1940) as Gannon (uncredited)
The Crooked Road (1940) as Phil Wesner, Defense Attorney
Edison, the Man (1940) as Second Lecturer (uncredited)
Alias the Deacon (1940) as Supervisor (uncredited)
On Their Own (1940) as Johnson
You Can't Fool Your Wife (1940) as Salesman (scenes deleted)
Queen of the Mob (1940) as Horace Grimley
We Who Are Young (1940) as Perkins
Rhythm on the River (1940) as Bernard Schwartz
The Great Profile (1940) as Director
The Leather Pushers (1940) as Henry 'Mitch' Mitchell
City for Conquest (1940) as Al - Dance Team Manager (uncredited)
A Little Bit of Heaven (1940) as Stafford (uncredited)
Blondie Plays Cupid (1940) as Train Conductor (uncredited)
Dancing on a Dime (1940) as Freeman Taylor
Ellery Queen, Master Detective (1940) as Dr. Prouty
Texas Rangers Ride Again (1940) as Train Passenger (uncredited)
The Invisible Woman (1940) as Growley
Back Street (1941) as Blake (uncredited)
You're the One (1941) as Announcer
Footlight Fever (1941) as Link - Insurance Agent (uncredited)
Ellery Queen's Penthouse Mystery (1941) as Doc Prouty
Repent at Leisure (1941) as Clarence Morgan
Barnacle Bill (1941) as Auctioneer (uncredited)
Sis Hopkins (1941) as Rollo
Blondie in Society (1941) as Washing Machine Salesman (uncredited)
The Big Store (1941) as Finance Company Agent (uncredited)
Ellery Queen and the Perfect Crime (1941) as Dr. Prouty
Sing Another Chorus (1941) as Ryan
Buy Me That Town (1941) as J. Montague Gainsborough
Three Girls About Town (1941) as Mortician (uncredited)
Birth of the Blues (1941) as Wilbur - Theater Manager (uncredited)
I Wake Up Screaming (1941) as Keating—Florist
New York Town (1941) as Census Taker (uncredited)
Appointment for Love (1941) as Smith (uncredited)
Look Who's Laughing (1941) as Club Secretary (uncredited)
Ball of Fire (1941) as Larsen
Sealed Lips (1942) as Attorney Emanuel 'Manny' T. Dixon
A Gentleman at Heart (1942) as Holloway
A Close Call for Ellery Queen (1942) as Coroner (uncredited)
Obliging Young Lady (1942) as Private Detective Smith
The Lady Is Willing (1942) as K.K. Miller
Ride 'Em Cowboy (1942) as Martin Manning (uncredited)
Born to Sing (1942) as Johnny (uncredited)
What's Cookin'? (1942) as K.D. Reynolds
The Great Man's Lady (1942) as Pierce (uncredited)
The Adventures of Martin Eden (1942) as Mr. White, Publisher (uncredited)
Yokel Boy (1942) as Cynic (uncredited)
About Face (1942) as Rental Car Manager
Home in Wyomin' (1942) as Newspaper Editor
Tarzan's New York Adventure (1942) as Gould Beaton
Broadway (1942) as Hungry Harry (uncredited)
Sunday Punch (1942) as Ringside spectator at Ole's first fight (uncredited)
The Mad Martindales (1942) as Virgil Hickling
They All Kissed the Bride (1942) as Spotter (uncredited)
Are Husbands Necessary? (1942) as Mr. Brooks
Lady in a Jam (1942) as Government Man (uncredited)
Thru Different Eyes (1942) as Mott
Friendly Enemies (1942) as Braun
Pardon My Sarong (1942) as Bus Company Superintendent (uncredited)
Flying Tigers (1942) as Repkin (uncredited)
Mission to Moscow (1943) as Man in Kitchen in Montage (uncredited)
Arsenic and Old Lace (1944) as Reporter
A Close Call for Boston Blackie (1946) as Hack Hagen (uncredited)
Just Before Dawn (1946) as Dr. Steiner (uncredited)
Mysterious Intruder (1946) as Detective Burns
The Invisible Informer (1946) as Nick Steele
The Show Off (1946) as Quiz Master (uncredited)
Swell Guy (1946) as Ben Tilwell (uncredited)
It's a Wonderful Life (1946) as Potter's Rent Collector 
The Farmer's Daughter (1947) as Jackson - Campaign Reporter
It Happened on Fifth Avenue (1947) as Landlord (uncredited)
Living in a Big Way (1947) as Hawkins (uncredited)
Bury Me Dead (1947) as Mr. Brighton (uncredited)
Louisiana (1947) as McCormack
Roses Are Red (1947) as Lipton
Intrigue (1947) as Hotel Desk Clerk
Call Northside 777 (1948) as Prosecuting Attorney (uncredited)
State of the Union (1948) as Blink Moran
Smart Woman (1948) as Reporter (uncredited)
Race Street (1948) as Switchboard Operator-Clerk (uncredited)
The Gentleman from Nowhere (1948) as Fenmore
Out of the Storm (1948) as Mr. Evans
Apartment for Peggy (1948) as Prof. Collins (uncredited)
Moonrise (1948) as Mr. Chandler - Man in Black
The Boy with Green Hair (1948) as Passerby (uncredited)
Mother Is a Freshman (1949) as Mr. De Haven (uncredited)
You're My Everything (1949) as Mr. Eddie Pflum (uncredited)
Mighty Joe Young (1949) as Producer (uncredited)
The House Across the Street (1949) as Apartment Manager (uncredited)
Miss Grant Takes Richmond (1949) as Mr. Woodruff (uncredited)

1950s

Backfire (1950) as Dr. Nolan (uncredited)
Borderline (1950) as Peterson—U.S. Customs Man (uncredited)
The Yellow Cab Man (1950) as L.A. Casualty Co. Executive (uncredited)
Riding High (1950) as Erickson
Love That Brute (1950) as Joe Evans - Cigar Store Owner (uncredited)
The Second Face (1950) as Mr. West - Insurance Claims Adjustor
The Du Pont Story (1950) as Lammot du Pont
For Heavens Sake (1950) as Arthur Crane (IRS) (uncredited)
I Can Get It for You Wholesale (1951) as Herman Pulvermacher (uncredited)
Criminal Lawyer (1951) as Frederick Waterman (uncredited)
Here Comes the Groom (1951) as FBI Agent Ralph Burchard (uncredited)
The Sniper (1952) as Drunk in Bar (uncredited)
Three for Bedroom "C" (1952) as Trainman (uncredited)
Burns & Allen TV Series (Jan 1, 1953) as Mr. Fitzpatrick
I Love Lucy (TV series) 
(1953: Lucy Goes to the Hospital)

(1953: Lucy Tells the Truth)

(1954: The Business Manager)

(1956: Staten Island Ferry)
The Juggler (1953) as Rosenberg
Remains to Be Seen (1953) as Delapp (examiner)
The Affairs of Dobie Gillis (1953) as Chemistry Professor Obispo
Francis Joins the WACS (1954) (uncredited)
Dear Phoebe (1954, TV series)
Willy (1954–1955) in episode "First Case" (1954)
Kiss Me Deadly (1955) as Doctor (uncredited)
The Birds and the Bees (1956) as Charlie Jenkins - Bartender
Top Secret Affair (1957) as Bill Hadley
God Is My Partner (1957) as Judge Warner
The People's Choice (1957) as Manager
The Real McCoys (1957-1958) (ABC-TV, two episodes) as Harry Poulson
Teacher's Pet (1958) as Roy
The Restless Gun (1958) as Mayor Pete Mercer in Episode "The Suffragette"
Perry Mason in the Fiery Fingers (1958) as Dr. Williams
Richard Diamond, Private Detective in "One Foot in the Grave" (CBS-TV, 1958) as Kevin Anders
The Mating Game (1959) as Inspector General Bigelow
The 30 Foot Bride of Candy Rock (1959) as Stanford Bates
But Not for Me (1959) as Al Atwood
Dennis The Menace (1959–1963) TV series  as Mr. Finch

1960s

The Tab Hunter Show (1960-1961) — Dr. Spike in "Personal Appearance" (1961) 
Pete and Gladys (1960-1962) — Mr. Vincent in "The House Next Door" (1961) and Slater in "Garden Wedding" (1962) 
The DuPont Show with June Allyson with June Allyson as Elsa Wilson, in "The Old-Fashioned Way" (1961) as Dr. Shelley
The Lucy Show (1962) as Mr. Barnstahl
Mister Ed - "Wilbur in the Lion's Den" (1962) 
The Music Man (1962) as Constable Locke
Mr. Smith Goes to Washington TV series (1963) as Caleb
It's a Mad, Mad, Mad, Mad World (1963) as Airport Manager
Papa's Delicate Condition (1963) as Mr. Cosgrove
The Wheeler Dealers (1963) as Judge (uncredited)
Petticoat Junction — (1963–1968) (24 episodes) as Homer Bedloe
The Beverly Hillbillies (1963-1971) as Foster Phinney / Homer Bedloe / Billy Hacker
Bewitched (1964–1972,  TV series) as  Mr. Roland / Mr. Cushman / Harold Jameson / Mr. Harmon / Mr. Meikeljohn / Shotwell / Jessie Mortimer / Ed Hotchkiss
The Andy Griffith Show in episode "Aunt Bee the Crusader"  (1964) as Mr. Frisby
Gomer Pyle, U.S.M.C. in episode 106 "Pay Day"  (1964) as General Richards
The Carpetbaggers (1964) as Denby
The New Interns (1964) as Connors
Good Neighbor Sam (1964) as Jack Bailey
Looking for Love (1964) as Screen Test Director
The Cara Williams Show in episode "Variety is the Spice of Wife" (1965) as McAvie
Get Smart in "My Nephew the Spy" (1965) as Uncle Abner
Kentucky Jones in "The Big Speech" (1965) as Doc Axby 
John Goldfarb, Please Come Home (1965) as 'Strife' Magazine Editor
Billie (1965) as Coach Jones
The Donna Reed Show in "The Big League Shock" (1965) as Mr. Sampson
The Munsters in "The Most Beautiful Ghoul in the World" (1966) as Mr. Edgar Z. Holmes
The Ghost and Mr. Chicken (1966) as Lawyer Whitlow
The Ugly Dachshund (1966) as Judge
The Pruitts of Southampton (1966-1967, TV series) as Maxwell
F Troop (1966) as Mr. S. A. MacGuire
He and She (1967) as Mr. Julius Simpson, US Immigration officer
Eight on the Lam (1967) as Bank Examiner (uncredited)
The Gnome-Mobile (1967) as Dr. Scoggins
What's So Bad About Feeling Good? (1968) as Dr. Shapiro
Did You Hear the One About the Traveling Saleslady? (1968) as Mr. Duckworth
Green Acres in episode "The Rummage Sale" (1968) as Mr Wilson 
My Dog, the Thief (1969) as Mr. Pfeiffer

1970s

The Aristocats (1970) as Georges Hautecourt (voice)
Nanny and the Professor (1970-1971, TV series) as Ticket Seller / Driving Inspector
Hitched (1971) as Round Tree
The Great Man's Whiskers (1972) as Philbrick
Get to Know Your Rabbit (1972) as Mr. Beeman
The Odd Couple in "Take my Furniture, Please" (1973) as Sid
Karen TV series (1975) as Dale Busch
Sybil (1976) as Dr. Quinoness
Family (1976) as James Lawrence / Thursday's Child
Movie Movie (1978) as Judge / Mr. Pennington
Soap (1977–1978, TV series) as Judge Petrillo
The Little Dragons (1979) as J.J.

1980s

 Return of the Beverly Hillbillies (1981) as Chief
 Strange Behavior (1981) as Donovan
 Little House on the Prairie episode "Welcome to Olsenville" (1982) as Jess Moffet
 The Winds of War (mini) series (1983) as Adm. William Standley
 Strange Invaders (1983) as Professor Hollister
 Sunset Limousine (1983) as Reinhammer
 Murphy's Romance (1985) as Amos Abbott
 When the Bough Breaks (1986) as Van der Graaf
 Vanishing America (1986) as Shopkeeper
 Date with an Angel (1987) as Father O'Shea
 War and Remembrance (mini) series (1988) as Adm. William Standley

1990s
 Dark Shadows (1991, episode #6) as Antique Dealer
 Acting on Impulse (1993) as Bellhop
 The Computer Wore Tennis Shoes (1995) as Regent Yarborough

2000s
 The Night Before Christmas (2006) (holiday short) as Narrator (voice)

References

Further reading

External links

Charles Lane at "Great Character Actors", DougMacaulay.com
Charles Lane — Obituary and tribute
Charles Lane 100th Birthday at the 2005 TV Land Awards
Charles Lane Find a grave

1905 births
2007 deaths
American centenarians
American male film actors
American male television actors
Jewish American male actors
Male actors from San Francisco
20th-century American male actors
People from Brentwood, Los Angeles
Men centenarians
20th-century American Jews
21st-century American Jews
Burials at Home of Peace Cemetery (Colma, California)